The Luzon forest rat or Luzon hairy-tailed rat (Batomys granti) is one of five species of rodent in the genus Batomys. It is in the diverse family Muridae.
This species is found only in the Philippines. This species was the first of the five to be identified and stayed the sole indicator for the genus for roughly 75 years, until 1988. Majority of this species lives on Mount Data which is one of several mountains in the Cordillera Mountains region of Northern Luzon.

References

 Heaney, L. 1996.  Batomys granti.   2006 IUCN Red List of Threatened Species.   Downloaded on 9 July 2007.

Balete, D. & Rickart, E. & Heaney, L. A new species of Batomys (Muridae, Rodentia) from southern Luzon Island, Philippines. BioOne Complete. Retrieved 11 April 2019.

Rats of Asia
Endemic fauna of the Philippines
Fauna of Luzon
Rodents of the Philippines
Batomys
Mammals described in 1895
Taxa named by Oldfield Thomas
Taxonomy articles created by Polbot